Domingos Culolo (born 1941 in Uíge Province) is an Angolan diplomat and lawyer. He is Angola's ambassador to Sweden. Prior to his appointment in Sweden, Culolo served as top diplomat to Slovakia. He also served as Attorney General and Deputy Attorney General.

References

Angolan diplomats
Living people
1941 births
People from Uíge Province
Ambassadors of Angola to Sweden
Attorneys General of Angola